Josef Schwemminger (21 June 1804, Vienna - 12 January 1895, Vienna) was an Austrian landscape painter.

Life and work 
His father, Anton Schwemminger (1764-1808), was a porcelain painter. His older brother, Heinrich, also became a painter.  His sister, Theresia, married the painter Karl Schubert; a brother of the composer Franz Schubert.

From 1817 to 1827, he studied at the Academy of Fine Arts, Vienna; specializing in landscapes, with motifs relating to the nationalistic concept of "Heimat". He travelled throughout Austria, Bavaria and Northern Italy. Many of his works were reproduced and distributed as steel engravings. In 1848, he became a member of the Academy and, in 1868, joined the Vienna Künstlerhaus.

He died, at the age of ninety, in Vienna's Alsergrund district.

References

Further reading

External links 

 More works by Schwemminger @ ArtNet

1804 births
1895 deaths
Austrian painters
Austrian landscape painters
Academy of Fine Arts Vienna alumni
Artists from Vienna